Sitio de Xitlapehua is a town and municipality in Oaxaca in south-western Mexico. 
It is part of the Miahuatlán District in the south of the Sierra Sur Region.

 
José Yolando Jarquín Bustamante became the tenth municipal president from Oaxaca to die from COVID-19 on January 26, 2021.

References

Municipalities of Oaxaca